Jean-Luc Pérat (born 23 January 1950 in Hirson) is a member of the National Assembly of France.  He represents the Nord department,  and is a member of the Socialiste, radical, citoyen et divers gauche.

References

1950 births
Living people
People from Aisne
Politicians from Hauts-de-France
Socialist Party (France) politicians
Deputies of the 13th National Assembly of the French Fifth Republic